Gerardo "Jerry" Catena (January 8, 1902 – April 23, 2000) was an American mobster and a top member of the Genovese crime family during the 1950s and 1960s, along with Thomas "Tommy Ryan" Eboli, Philip "Benny Squint" Lombardo and Michael "Big Mike" Miranda.  He was ranked as the fourth richest mobster in the United States by Fortune magazine.

Early life in Jersey
Catena was born on January 8, 1902, in South Orange, New Jersey to Francesco and Donata Speziale, and subsequently became familiar with legendary mobsters Guarino "Willie" Moretti, Thomas Greco, Cosmo "Gus" Frasca,  and Abner "Longy" Zwillman. He was married to Catherine McNally and was the father to Patricia, Geraldine, Donna, Vicki and Richard. He was the brother of Eugene, Mary Frederico and Sadie Dellasante. He was a vending machine racketeer with interests in People's Express Co., Advance Vending Co, Runyon Vending Sales Co and TrenMetals/Kool-Vent Awning Co. all based in Newark, New Jersey.

Later, it has been confirmed that Catena moved to New York City to join the forces of Charlie "Lucky" Luciano and Meyer Lansky during the early 1920s, when the rise of two Mafia dons named Giuseppe "Joe the Boss" Masseria and Salvatore Maranzano, began fighting a bloody internal battle called the Castellammarese War.

Joining the Lucianos
Little is known of Catena in his early days of the Luciano crime family, but reportedly he was a soldier in the crew that became the powerful Genovese crew during the late 1920s, headed by later underboss Vito "Don Vito" Genovese. As the time passed, and Charles Luciano went to prison and later deportation in the 1940s, Genovese organized the shooting of the boss of the Luciano crime family, Frank Costello, in 1957, which forced Costello to retire. Apparently, Catena is to have risen through the ranks, as he was listed as the underboss in the late 1950s, heading the New Jersey faction of the Genovese crime family, under the leadership of Vito Genovese.

Attending Apalachin
Catena was attending the so-called Apalachin Meeting in 1957, and was one of the hundred mafiosi who were indicted after the convention, following the arrest of Vito Genovese in 1959. As Genovese and many others of the Genovese crime family were under indictment, Catena began cooperating with longtime captains Anthony "Tony Bender" Strollo, Michele "Big Mike" Miranda and Thomas "Tommy Ryan" Eboli, and were unofficially running the Genovese crime family.

Underboss
After the imprisonment of Genovese in 1959, a "Committee/Ruling Panel" was to run the Genovese crime family, which consisted of Catena, Philip "Benny Squint" Lombardo, Thomas Eboli (who was murdered in 1972) and Michele Miranda. This administration continued to run the family throughout the 1960s and early 1970s.

Imprisonment
Catena was incarcerated at the Yardville State Prison (now the Garden State Youth Correctional Facility) from 1970 to 1975 because he had refused to testify before the New Jersey State Commission of Investigation.

Retirement and death
After his incarceration, Catena was allegedly semi-retired due to illness, and became officially retired after his release in 1975, as he moved to Boca Raton, Florida that same year. Gerardo Catena died of natural causes on April 23, 2000, at the age of 98.

Involvement with Bally's
Catena was a secret investor in slot machine manufacturer Bally Manufacturing during its early years. This resulted in William T. O'Donnell, the chairman and CEO, resigning from the company in 1979 in order for them to receive a casino permit to operate Bally's Atlantic City casino.

References

Sources
Bernstein, Lee. The Greatest Menace:  Organized Crime in Cold War America. Boston: Univ of Massachusetts Press, 2001. 
Lamothe, Lee and Antonio Nicaso. Bloodlines: The Rise and Fall of the Mafia's Royal Family. Toronto: HarperCollins Publishers, 2001. 
Peterson, Robert W. Crime & the American Response. New York: Facts on File, 1973. 
Raab, Selwyn. Five Families: The Rise, Decline, and Resurgence of America's Most Powerful Mafia Empires. New York: St. Martin's Press, 2005. 
Reppetto, Thomas. American Mafia: A History of Its Rise to Power. New York: Henry Holt & Co., 2004. 
Sterling, Claire. Octopus: The Long Reach of the International Sicilian Mafia. New York: Simon & Schuster (Touchstone Edition), 1991.
United States. Congress. Senate. Committee on Governmental Affairs. Permanent Subcommittee on Investigations. Profile On Organized Crime Mid-Atlantic Region. Washington, D.C.: U.S. G.P.O., 1983. 
Pennsylvania Crime Commission: 1984 Report. St. Davids, Pennsylvania: DIANE Publishing, 1984.

External links
https://web.archive.org/web/20081024140730/http://www.politickernj.com/tags/jerry-catena
http://crimemagazine.com/eboli.htm
http://americanmafia.com/Cities/New_York_New_Jersey.html
http://carpenoctem.tv/mafia/genovesef.html

1902 births
2000 deaths
People from South Orange, New Jersey
American gangsters of Italian descent
Genovese crime family